Nicolás Díaz Sánchez (August 10, 1929 – October 18, 2019) was a Chilean politician and cardiologist, member of the Christian Democrat Party of Chile (PDC).

Biography
Díaz Sánchez was born on August 10, 1929, in the city of Rancagua. He studied in the O'Higgins Institute of Rancagua, and afterwards he completed his higher education in the Medicine Faculty of the University of Chile, where he graduated as a surgeon in 1955.

He began his political career as regional chief (in O'Higgins Region) of Eduardo Frei Montalva during the 1958 elections. He later joined the Christian Democrat Party of Chile, and in 1963 he was elected mayor of Rancagua, but he renounced the following year. He was elected again in 1967, but he also renounced in 1968. He was appointed Intendent of O'Higgins Region in 1970, by President Salvador Allende.

After holding several charges inside his party during the military regime, and having participated in the "No" movement during the National Plebiscite of 1988, he was elected Senator of the Chilean Republic for the VI Libertador Bernardo O'Higgins Region, an office he would hold from 1990 until 1998. Between 2004 and 2008, he was councillor of Rancagua.

He died on October 18, 2019, in Rancagua.

References

1929 births
2019 deaths
Members of the Senate of Chile
Chilean cardiologists
Christian Democratic Party (Chile) politicians
University of Chile alumni
People from Rancagua
Instituto O'Higgins de Rancagua alumni
Mayors of places in Chile